O Şarkılar... Hakkı Yalçın Şarkıları is 2004 album with songs written by Hakkı Yalçın. As his retirement as a lyricist and journalist, Hakkı Yalçın released this special album which contains some lyrics he wrote during his musical career. Every song is performed by a different Turkish artist. There's only one video taken for this album, that for "Sen Gittin mi Ben Ölürüm".

Track listing

 All the lyrics written by Hakkı Yalçın.

Credits
Musical Director: Metin Özülkü
Arrangements: Metin Özülkü & Genco Arı (Except "Alışkanlık Yaparım" that was arranged by Ahmet Özden)
Studio: Düet Müzik
Mastering: Serdar Ağırlı

Violin: Gündem Yaylı Grubu
Reed Flute: Eyüp Hamiş
Guitar: Erdem Sökmen
Clarinet: Bülent Altınbaş
Kanun: Aytaç Doğan
Buzuki: Metin Özülkü
Lute: Sinan Özen
Solo Violin: Ferda Anıl Yarkın
Ritm Saz 'a stringed instrument': Cengiz Ercümer
Back Vocals: Metin Özülkü, Sibel Sezal
Graphics: Levent Göçtü
Press: Onur Ofset

World music albums by Turkish artists
2004 compilation albums
Compilation albums by Turkish artists